A Cure for Loneliness is the eighth studio album by American musician Peter Wolf. It was released on April 8, 2016, by Concord Records.

Reception

A Cure for Loneliness received positive reviews from critics upon release. On Metacritic, the album holds a score of 76/100 based on 7 reviews, indicating "generally favorable reviews."

Track listing

Charts

References

2016 albums
Peter Wolf albums
Concord Records albums